Crawford William Bridges-Maxwell (27 September 1929 – 15 April 1992) was an Australian politician. Born in Hobart, Tasmania, he was educated at Geelong Grammar School and then the Royal Agricultural College in England, after which he became a veterinary scientist. In 1964, following the resignation of Roger Dean, Bridges-Maxwell was selected as the Liberal candidate for the Australian House of Representatives seat of Robertson in New South Wales, which he won in the by-election resulting from Dean's resignation. He held the seat until his defeat by Barry Cohen of the Labor Party in 1969. Bridges-Maxwell died in 1992.

References

Liberal Party of Australia members of the Parliament of Australia
Members of the Australian House of Representatives for Robertson
Members of the Australian House of Representatives
1929 births
1992 deaths
20th-century Australian politicians